Steven Kliewer is an American biochemist, a significant figure in his field, currently the Nancy B. and Jake L. Hamon Distinguished Chair in Basic Cancer Research at University of Texas Southwestern Medical Center. In 2015, he was elected to the National Academy of Sciences. He, along with David Mangelsdorf, identified the ligands and physiologic functions of a number of orphan nuclear receptors that then discovered two new signaling pathways mediated by the endocrine factors FGF19 and FGF21, which has become a significant accomplishment in the field.

References

Year of birth missing (living people)
Living people
University of Texas faculty
Brown University alumni
American biochemists
Place of birth missing (living people)